Africa is often considered and referred as the "Sun continent" or the continent where the Sun's influence is the greatest.
According to the "World Sunshine Map", Africa receives many more hours of bright sunshine during the course of the year than any other continent of the Earth: and many of the sunniest countries on the planet are in Africa.

Despite the large solar potential, penetration of solar power in Africa's energy sector is still very low.

Solar potential

The whole continent has a long duration of sunshine, and excluding the large areas of tropical rainforests (the Guinean Forests of West Africa and much of the Congo Basin), as the desert and savannah regions of Africa represent Earth's largest cloud-free area.
Africa is dominated by clear skies even beyond deserts (ex : Sahara, Namib, Kalahari), however, the regions located along the equator are considerably cloudier than the tropics and subtropics.

The eastern Sahara/northeastern Africa is particularly noted for its world sunshine records. The area experiences some of the greatest mean annual duration of bright sunshine, with the sun shining brightly for approximatively 4,300 hours a year, equivalent to 97% of the possible total.
This region also has the highest mean annual values of solar radiation (the maximum recorded being over 220 kcal/cm2).

The low latitude of the landmass is another asset: much of the continent lies in the intertropical zone, where the intensity and the strength of the sunlight are always high.
The area contains lots of vast sun-drenched arid and semi-arid expanses in the north, in the south, and to a lesser extent in the east. About two fifths of the continent are desert, and thus continuously sunny.

The combination of all these geographical and climatic factors is the cause of the large solar potential of Africa. The number of days of sunlight allows the potential of bringing solar power to much of Africa without large scale grid infrastructure.

The distribution of solar resources across Africa is fairly uniform, with more than 85% of the continent's landscape receiving a global solar horizontal irradiation at or over 2,000 kWh/(m2 year).
Also, the theoretical reserves of Africa's solar energy are estimated at 60,000,000 TWh/year, which accounts for almost 40% of the global total, thus making Africa the most sun-rich continent in the world.

Pay-as-you-go Solar
Pay-as-you-go Solar System offers credit to poorer customers in rural Africa, thereby allowing them to invest in infrastructure for their homes. The most consistent approach to tackling this huge obstacle to development has come with the off-grid pay-as-you-go solar power model, now called PayGo, which in some countries such as Malawi where a company called Yellow is electrifying the population faster than grid electricity. PayGo system leverage the technologies of Mobile money to receive payments from their customers allowing them to pay from rural locations without a smartphone or access to internet.

Solar photovoltaics

Declining solar equipment costs were expected to significantly increase solar installations in Africa with an industry projection forecasting that the continent's annual PV market would expand to 2.2 GW by 2018.
Future installations for harvesting solar energy in Africa will tend not to be found within the equatorial and subequatorial climate zones, that are located in the western part of Central Africa usually near the equator but that extend as far north and south as the 8th or 9th parallel in both hemispheres, since they are systematically linked with almost permanent cloud cover and only intermittent bright sunshine. Therefore, countries that entirely lie in this wet-humid zone such as the Republic of the Congo, Equatorial Guinea, Gabon, Rwanda, Uganda, Burundi, Liberia, Sierra Leone and Senegal are by far the least favoured in solar power of all the continent and except for these eight quoted nations, each other African country experiences over 2,700 hours of bright sunshine on at least a part of its territory. Many perpetually sunny African nations like Egypt, Libya, Algeria, Niger, Sudan, South Africa, Botswana and Namibia for instance could rely on developing their tremendous solar resources on a large scale thanks to the immense surface of their territory and at reduced prices.

South Africa is a leader in solar power in Africa with 1329 MW installed by 2016. Solar power in South Africa is rapidly growing. Several 75 MW PV plants and 2 CSP plants at 100 MW each were the largest in the country and among the largest in Africa. South Africa has announced a plan to install a minigrid on Robben Island; adding PV and battery storage is predicted by reduce diesel usage by half.

A 50 MW photovoltaic power plant is planned for Garissa in Kenya, a city located at the equator where the sun is said to shine for about 3,144 hours each year on average, and it is expected to produce approximately 76,473 MWh/year.

A 155 MW photovoltaic power plant is planned for Ghana and the government plans to increase solar power in the country from 22.5MW in 2017 to 300MW in 2020.

There are also many small-scale modular solar power installations being implemented across the continent at the village and household levels. 
In 2015, Sub-Saharan Africa was the leading region for purchases of off-grid solar products.

Solar thermal power

The Kingdom of Morocco’s solar plan, which is one of the world’s largest solar energy projects and estimated to cost about $9 billion, was introduced in November 2009 with the aim of establishing 2,000 MW of solar power by 2020. Five sites have been selected for the development of solar power plants combining a number of technologies including concentrated solar power, parabolic trough as well as photovoltaics, with the 500MW phase one solar power complex at Ouarzazate being the first to be developed. The first part of the 500MW project, the 160MW Noor I came online in 2016 and uses parabolic trough concentrated solar power technology. Morocco, the only African country to have a power cable link to Europe, aims to benefit from energy sales to Europe. One such initiative was Desertec.

South Africa has developed several solar thermal plants, both parabolic trough and power tower types. In 2017, it was the leading country in Africa for both solar thermal and PV solar energy.

See also

 Solar power in Algeria
 Solar power in Morocco
 Solar power in South Africa
 Renewable energy in Africa
 Solar power by country

References

Renewable energy in Africa